The 1944 United States presidential election in Indiana took place on November 7, 1944, as part of the 1944 United States presidential election. Indiana voters chose 13 representatives, or electors, to the Electoral College, who voted for president and vice president.

Indiana was won by Governor Thomas E. Dewey (R–New York), running with Governor John Bricker, with 52.38% of the popular vote, against incumbent President Franklin D. Roosevelt (D–New York), running with Senator Harry S. Truman, with 46.73% of the popular vote.

Results

Results by county

See also
 United States presidential elections in Indiana

References

Indiana
1944
1944 Indiana elections